Leonid Ignatievich Lubennikov (Russian: Леони́д Игна́тьевич Лубе́нников; 21 January 1910 – 28 November 1988) was a Soviet politician who served as the last First Secretary of the Communist Party of the Karelo-Finnish Soviet Socialist Republic from late 1955 to 1956. He was also the father of Russian painter Ivan Lubennikov.

Early life and education 
Lubennikov was born into a peasant family of Russian ethnicity in the village of Forminovka (now Antratsyt Raion), Yekaterinoslav Governorate, Russian Empire on January 21, 1910 (O.S. January 8, 1910). He graduated from the Novocherkassk Industrial and Agricultural College in 1930. He later graduated from the All Union Agro-Pedagogical Institute and the M.V. Frunze Military Academy in 1933 and 1944, respectively.

Before being admitted into the Communist Party of the Soviet Union in 1939, Lubennikov worked as teacher of tractor courses in the Ural region from December 1930 to April 1931. He was the Director of and a teacher at the Balandovskaya School of Combine Operators from 1933 to 1939.

Political career 
Lubennikov served as a propaganda instructor and Military Commissar of the Volga Military District from October 1939 to March 1944. From May 1944 to May 1946, he worked in the Brest region. From June 1946 to February 1949, he became a CPSU party organizer at a tractor plant in Minsk. He worked mostly with the Communist Party of Byelorussia between 1949 and 1953. He was elected as a candidate member of the Politburo of the Central Committee of the Communist Party of Byelorussia on February 14, 1954. He became the Inspector of the Central Committee of the Communist Party of the Soviet Union in August 1955. On August 16, 1955, Lubennikov became the First Secretary of the Communist Party of the Karelo-Finnish Soviet Socialist Republic and served until July 25, 1956 when the party was dissolved due to the liquidation of the Karelo-Finnish Soviet Socialist Republic. He succeeded himself as First Secretary of the Communist Party of the Karelo-Finnish Soviet Socialist Republic when he assumed the office of First Secretary of the Karelian Regional Committee of the Communist Party of the Soviet Union; he served in the position until September 1958. He served as the Head of the Department of the Industry of Consumer Goods and Food Products in the Central Committee of the Communist Party of the Soviet Union from September 1958 to February 1960. From February 12, 1960 to December 23, 1964, Lubennikov served as the First Secretary of the Kemerovo Regional Committee of the Communist Party of the Soviet Union. From December 1964 to 1965, he served as the Deputy Chairman of the Committee on Party and State Control of the Political Bureau of the Communist Party of the Soviet Union. From 1965 to 1966, he served as the Deputy Chairman of the Committee of People's Control of the Council of Ministers of the Russian Soviet Federative Socialist Republic. From 1966 until his retiring in 1981, he finally served as the Deputy Chairman of the Board of the Central Union of Consumer Societies.

He was elected a delegate to the 19th Congress of the Communist Party of the Soviet Union, the 20th Congress of the Communist Party of the Soviet Union, the 21st Congress of the Communist Party of the Soviet Union, and the 22nd Congress of the Communist Party of the Soviet Union. He was a member of the Central Committee of the Communist Party of the Soviet Union from 1956 to 1966. He was also a deputy of the Supreme Soviet of the Soviet Union from 1954 to 1966.

Death 
Leonid Lubennikov died on November 28, 1988, at the age of 78 in Moscow, Russian Soviet Federative Socialist Republic, Soviet Union. He was buried at the Kuntsevo Cemetery.

Awards 

  Order of Lenin (twice)
  Order of the Red Banner (twice)
  Order of the October Revolution
  Order of the Patriotic War (1st Class)
  Order of the Red Banner of Labour (twice)

See also 

 Communist Party of the Karelo-Finnish Soviet Socialist Republic

References 

Recipients of the Order of Lenin
Recipients of the Order of the Red Banner
1910 births
1988 deaths
People from Luhansk Oblast
People from Yekaterinoslav Governorate
First Secretaries of the Communist Party of the Karelo-Finnish Soviet Socialist Republic
Fourth convocation members of the Supreme Soviet of the Soviet Union
Fifth convocation members of the Supreme Soviet of the Soviet Union
Sixth convocation members of the Supreme Soviet of the Soviet Union
Soviet military personnel of World War II